111 athletes (84 men and 27 women) from Sweden competed at the 1996 Summer Paralympics in Atlanta, United States.

Medallist table

See also
Sweden at the Paralympics
Sweden at the 1996 Summer Olympics

References 

Nations at the 1996 Summer Paralympics
1996
Summer Paralympics